Matsugasaki  Gymnasium (松ケ崎体育館) is an indoor sporting arena located in Matsugasaki, Yurihonjo, Akita, Japan.  It hosts indoor sporting events such as basketball and volleyball and is practice home to the Prestige International Aranmare Akita that will play in the Women's Japan Basketball League.

Facilities
Main arena - 738m2

See also 
 Nices Arena

References 

Sports venues in Akita Prefecture
Indoor arenas in Japan
Basketball venues in Japan
Prestige International Aranmare Akita
Yurihonjō